Pope John Paul II High School is a Catholic high school in Upper Providence Township, Pennsylvania, near Royersford in Montgomery County within the Archdiocese of Philadelphia. The school teaches Catholicism as well as other academic subjects. The schools named in honor of Saint Pope John Paul II.

History 
The school is a merger of Kennedy-Kenrick Catholic High School, in Norristown, Pa., and St. Pius X High School, in Lower Pottsgrove Township (Pottstown), Pa., by the Archdiocese of Philadelphia. The school opened in September 2010.

Academics 
To graduate students need to complete 0.5 art credits, 0.5 technology credits, 1 health and gym credit, 2 language credits(of the same language), 3 math credits, 3 history credits, 3 science credits, 4 ELA credits, 4 Catholic theology credits, and 5 elective credits that are chosen by the students. To earn 0.5 credits you need to pass 1 semester of a class.

Languages

Pope John Paul II High School offers 3 languages: French, Spanish, and Italian. The school also offers ASL and Latin through the Arrupe Virtual Learning Institute

Levels of Classes

Pope John Paul II High School offers three categories of courses:

College Preparatory

On-level courses

Honors

Advanced courses

Advanced Placement

Collage-level courses

Religion 
As Pope John Paul II High School is a Catholic school every month the whole school celebrates Catholic Mass and the students are offered Mass and Eucharistic adoration during their lunch periods. The students are also needed to complete 4 years of education in Catholic theology in order to graduate. Despite being a Catholic school the school prides itself on its openness to all faiths.

Arts
Studio 38 is the name of the performing arts program at Pope John Paul II High School and the program is headed by Mrs. Marusia Lynn. This department has two major annual performances, being the Rhapsodies and the Spring Musicals. The Rhapsodies is a performance of the Pope John Paul II High School Rhapsodies Show Choir, which takes place in the late fall of each school year. Auditions are open to all students in the late spring or early summer each year. The auditions and practicing for the Spring Musical begins in mid to late winter and the show itself is performed in early spring. Pope John Paul II High School performs a different musical each year. However, there are two exceptions; the two performances of Les Miserables in 2011 and 2016, and the two years of Phantom of the Opera, as the first was cut short due to the Covid-19 outbreak.

List of Spring Musicals

Band 
The concert band is open to all students that play an instrument and they play at various school events throughout the year. Within the band, there are the subgroups of the Jazz Band, String Ensemble, and Percussion Ensemble.

Athletics
PJP offers athletics for their students to participate in. They have fall, winter, and spring sports, with separate teams for the boys and the girls. Each team usually consists of a Junior Varsity and Varsity.

Fall sports 

 Field Hockey
 Football
 Golf
 Soccer
 Girls Tennis
 Volleyball
 Cheer
 Cross Country

Winter Sports 

 Cheer
 Wrestling
 Basketball
 Swimming

Spring Sports 

 Baseball
 Softball
 Track and Field
 Lacrosse
 Boys Tennis

References

External links
 Pope John Paul II High School official website

Catholic secondary schools in Pennsylvania
Educational institutions established in 2010
2010 establishments in Pennsylvania
Schools in Montgomery County, Pennsylvania